270toWin is an American political website that projects who will win United States presidential elections and allows users to create their own electoral maps. It also tracks the results of United States presidential elections by state throughout the country's history.

The website has information about elections and the political system, such as presidential electoral results dating back to 1789, pundit forecasts, voting history and trends by state, polling data, live updates during elections, and other information such as a lookup by zip code of elected representatives.

The website is used by schools to teach about the electoral college process.

References 

American political websites